On the Record with Bob Costas was an American monthly sports television talk show hosted by the sportscaster Bob Costas. The show ran for four 12-week seasons on HBO from 2001 to 2004 before being revamped into Costas Now.

On the Record with Bob Costas was, in a sense, similar to Costas' previous late night talk show, Later, which Costas hosted on NBC from 1988 to 1994. Both programs featured one-on-one interviews with guests from the sports and show business.

In 2021, HBO announced a revival of the show, now titled Back on the Record with Bob Costas – presumably retitled to minimize confusion with the unrelated 2020 HBO Max documentary On the Record – which premiered on July 30, 2021, and air up to four times per year. In December 2022, HBO confirmed that the show was canceled after two seasons.

See also
 Football Night in America
 Costas on the Radio
 Later with Bob Costas

References

External links
 
 
 HBO Archives: Sports Journalism - On the Record with Bob Costas and CostasNow

HBO Sports
HBO original programming
2001 American television series debuts
2004 American television series endings
2000s American television talk shows
American sports television series
English-language television shows
HBO Shows (series) WITHOUT Episode info, list, or Article